Sergey Petrovich Shukalov (1883, Yaroslavl - ?) was a Soviet weapons designer.

1883 births
Year of death unknown
People from Yaroslavl
Weapon designers from the Soviet Union